The 2016 Sky Blue FC season was the team's seventh season. Sky Blue played the 2016 season in National Women's Soccer League, the top tier of women's soccer in the United States.

Team

Roster
The first team roster of Sky Blue FC.

Current squad

Match results

Preseason

Regular season

Standings

Results summary

Results by round

Squad statistics
Source: NWSL

Honors and awards

NWSL Awards

NWSL Yearly Awards

NWSL Player of the Week

References

Match reports (preseason)

Match reports (regular season)

External links

See also
 2016 National Women's Soccer League season
 2016 in American soccer

Sky Blue FC
Sky Blue FC
NJ/NY Gotham FC seasons
Sky Blue FC